St. Vincent High School is a private, Roman Catholic high school in Perryville, Missouri.  It is located in the Roman Catholic Archdiocese of Saint Louis.

Background

St. Vincent was established in 1896 as St. Vincent Parish School.  The Daughters of Charity took over teaching responsibility in 1907.

References

External links
 School Website

Catholic secondary schools in Missouri
Schools in Perry County, Missouri
Educational institutions established in 1896
Private middle schools in Missouri
Roman Catholic Archdiocese of St. Louis
1896 establishments in Missouri